Caitlin Doeglas (born 1 September 1996) is an Australian soccer player who played for Perth Glory in the W-League.

She made her debut for Perth in the 2015–16 W-League and plays as an attacking midfielder. In the 2016–17 season she scored the second fastest goal in W-league history against Western Sydney Wanderers when she scored in 14 seconds. This was also her first goal in the competition. She was described by her coach, Bobby Despotovski, as a "versatile player who can operate both in midfield and up front".

She also played for Alamein FC in the National Premier Leagues Victoria.

Doeglas departed Perth Glory ahead of the 2021–22 A-League Women season.

References 

Australian women's soccer players
1996 births
Living people
Women's association footballers not categorized by position